Queen of the Dawn is a 1925 novel by British author H Rider Haggard, set in Ancient Egypt.

References

External links

Novels by H. Rider Haggard
1925 British novels
Novels set in ancient Egypt